Matuku is a volcanic island in the Moala subgroup of Fiji's Lau archipelago.  Located at 19.18° South and 179.75° East, Matuku covers an area of 57 square kilometers.  It has a maximum elevation of 385 meters. Matuku is part of a group of islands known as Yasayasa Moala.

There are altogether seven villages in Matuku namely Yaroi, Natokalau, Qalikarua, Levukaidaku, Makadru, Raviravi and Lomati.

There are conflicting accounts on whether or not the island was conquered by the Tongans led by the Tongan Prince Enele Ma'afu. Oral history passed down through the native Matuku people states that the island was not conquered by Enele Ma'afu whilst historical records state other wise. Thomas Williams a missionary in the island group records in a journal entry that Matuku was conquered by Ma'afu in 1853 after a three month long siege at the principle village of Yaroi. Although journals of Thomas Williams say Matuku was also among the islands conquered by Ma'afu, customs and traditions in the island of Matuku and its people divert from that of other conquered islands in the Lau group. The 'tawala' or mats that are worn around the waist by Tongans during ceremonies are also worn by every island in the Lau group except Matuku. This is a symbolism of victory of the people of Matuku over the Tongan chief and his men.

Matuku has produced a number of people who have contributed to the development and progress of Fiji and have held public office during their time. The late Reverend Setareki Tuilovoni hailed from Natokalau, to be the first local President of the Methodist Church of Fiji and Rotuma since it became an independent entity, and Reveremd Setareki Rika and his family who have either served as Church Ministers, Doctors or Teachers. Dr Macu Salato hailed from Qalikarua who became the Lord Mayor of Suva, Dr Peni Rika hailed from Makadru, along with numerous medical practitioners, teachers, and clergymen. The late Setareki Tuinaceva, who held office with the Fiji Rugby Union for a number of years, hailed from Lomati. Sir Timoci Tuivaga, who served as Fiji's first native-born Chief Justice from 1974 to 2002, was also from Matuku. The late Former Member of Parliament and Government Minister Hon Jonetani Kaukimoce was from Qalikarua. Savenaca Tuivaga was the Fiji Police Contingent leader to the Solomon Islands and other international assignments. Joeli Veitayaki, former Fiji 15s rugby captain was also a native of the island.

Islands of Fiji
Lau Islands